Murdoch McDonald (1 July 1901–1934) was a Scottish footballer who played in the Football League for Brighton & Hove Albion and Reading.

References

1901 births
1934 deaths
Scottish footballers
Association football forwards
English Football League players
Cowdenbeath F.C. players
Bo'ness F.C. players
Rangers F.C. players
Reading F.C. players
Brighton & Hove Albion F.C. players
Bray Unknowns F.C. players